Writing: The Story of Alphabets and Scripts is a 1987 illustrated monograph on the history of the alphabet and writing. Written by French linguist Georges Jean, and published by Éditions Gallimard as the 24th volume in their "Découvertes" collection. The book is one of the five bestsellers in the collection, together with The Search for Ancient Egypt.

Synopsis 

Drawing on unearthed artefacts and historical documents, Georges Jean illustrates the history of writing from an archaeological perspective and with a diachronic approach. The author chose to organise Writing chronologically, stretching it from the cuneiform of Mesopotamia in 3200 BC, through the Phoenician alphabet around 1000 BC, to modern typographical techniques, with descriptions of how writing appeared almost simultaneously in ancient Mesopotamia, Egypt, and China. The author focuses on the introduction of Near Eastern and Western scripts, but also covers the characteristics and differences of some Far Eastern writing systems, Chinese, Indian and Tibetan, for instance.

The book details a variety of writing tools and media, such as clay tablets used by the Sumerians, reed pen and papyrus of the ancient Egyptians, Roman writing awls, quill and parchment of those medieval Irish monks, as well as brush, fountain pen, stone, paper, printing press, etc. It also discusses how these different writing methods and printing tools affect the development of written content, whether it can be circulated in large quantities, and the ways and channels for circulation.

Contents

Body text 

 "Trailer": a succession of miniatures from the Chronicles of Jean Froissart, reproduced as full-page illustrations accompanied by captions.
 Chapter I: "Humble Beginnings" deals with the emergence of writing, with cuneiforms, which occurred due to accounting needs.
 Chapter II: "Invention of the Gods" deals with other ancient writing systems, such as those of Egypt and China, and highlights the fact that writing was considered by many peoples as a gift from the gods.
 Chapter III: "The Alphabet Revolution" deals with Semitic writings, and how the creation of Greek, Latin and Etruscan scripts being inspired by the Phoenician alphabet.
 Chapter IV: "From Copyists to Printers" deals with historical aspects outside the writing system itself in the Western world. With regard to the manuscripts, it deals with the importance of monks, scrolls, abbeys and monasteries. It discusses the role of calligraphers, illuminators, miniaturists, and bookbinders in the history of books. And it points out the gradual secularisation of writing.
 Chapter V: "The Bookmakers" deals with the history of the reproduction of written text, from copyists to the printing. The rise of the art of binding and pocket-sized books during the Renaissance era. The expansion of newspapers in the 18th century, thanks to the progress of printing technology, the first periodicals had appeared at the beginning of the 17th century in the Netherlands and in Germany.
 Chapter VI: "The Decipherers" chronicles the deciphering of hieroglyphs, cuneiforms, and Linear B. The chapter ends with a discussion of "still undeciphered signs", such as Linear A and Phaistos Disc from Crete, and the mysterious Rongorongo of Easter Island.

Documents 
The second part of this book is made up of an anthology of "Documents", which delves into more specialised texts and relevant authors on aspects of writing already covered in the body matter — the art of typography, digits and images, the tools for writing, calligraphy, the world's different writing systems, etc.

 The Letter and the City
 The Implications of Writing
 The Typographer's Art
 Early Printing in Europe
 From Pen to Print
 Writing Music
 The Influence of Technique
 Calligraphy and Games with Letters
 The Art of Writing in China
 Alpha, Beta, and Others
 Further Reading
 List of Illustrations
 Index
 Acknowledgments/Photograph Credits

References

Further reading

External links 

  
 

1987 non-fiction books
Historical linguistics books
Archaeology books
Découvertes Gallimard
History of writing